Cremenea may refer to several villages in Romania:

 Cremenea, a village in Gherăseni Commune, Buzău County
 Cremenea, a village in Bobâlna Commune, Cluj County
 Cremenea, a village in Tâmna Commune, Mehedinţi County
Cremenea River
Cremenea Mare River
Cremenea Branch of Danube